J. maculata may refer to:

 Janella maculata, a land slug
 Junodia maculata, a praying mantis